Charles Paul Hammock (August 24, 1941 – February 15, 2014) was a former Democratic member of the Pennsylvania House of Representatives.

Biography
Hammock was also active in the Black Catholic Movement and served for a time as president of the board of directors for the National Office for Black Catholics. He was one of five African-American Catholics to take their grievances against US Catholic racism to the Vatican in a bid to meet with Pope Paul VI. Their efforts were ultimately unsuccessful.

Hammock graduated from Roman Catholic High School in Philadelphia, Pennsylvania. He then received his bachelor's degree in economics from Villanova University.

Death
He died on February 15, 2014.

References

Democratic Party members of the Pennsylvania House of Representatives
Villanova University alumni
1941 births
2014 deaths
African-American Catholics